The 1925 Kent State Silver Foxes football team represented Kent State during the 1925 college football season. In its first season under head coach Merle E. Wagoner, Kent State compiled a 1–1–3 record and was outscored by a total of 24 to 13. On November 14, 1925, the team won the program's first victory on the field, defeating West Liberty by a 7-6 score. (The program's only prior victory was by default in 1920.)

The Chestnut Burr for 1926 summarized the 1925 football season as follows:Athletics at Kent State were in an unusually depressed condition when Coach Merle Wagoner and Director Frank L. Oktavec came to take charge in the fall of '25. The college had lost 37 consecutive games scoring only one touchdown in all these games. Although Kent won but one game she can boast of going through a whole season with but one defeat. The success of this season cannot be attributed to any one player but we do owe Coach Wagoner much praise for the success of the past season. His general good spirits and his contagious enthusiasm have already won for him the respect of the college men and there is no doubt but what his success for another season will prove just as successful.

Schedule

Roster 
The roster of the 1925 Kent state football team was as follows:
 Peterka, 185 pounds, fullback and captain
 Vair, 150 pounds, left end
 Jennings, 150 pounds, left tackle
 C. Davis, 180 pounds, right guard
 Chernin, 155 pounds, center
 F. Hall, 250 pounds, left guard
 R. Hall, 240 pounds, right tackle
 Menough, 145 pounds, quarterback
 Colville, 165 pounds, left tackle
 Crosby, 140 pounds, right end
 Feeley, 165 pounds, right halfback
 Francis, 175 pounds, left halfback
 Harvey, 150 pounds, left end
 Morris, 150 pounds, left guard
 Levering, 150 pounds, fullback
 Brown, 144 pounds, center
 N. McDermott, 144 pounds, quarterback
 Schwartz, 160 pounds, right halfback
 Hallihan, 155 pounds, center
 Spangler, 151 pounds, left guard
 Barry, 155 pounds, left guard
 Arnold, 172 pounds, right end
 A. Davis, 120 pounds, right end
 Burkett, 120 pounds, right end
 Deakins, 150 pounds, left guard
 Dunlevy, 160 pounds, right halfback

References

Kent State
Kent State Golden Flashes football seasons
Kent State Golden Flashes football